The 1971 1. divisjon was the 27th completed season of top division football in Norway.

Overview
It was contested by 10 teams, and Rosenborg BK won the championship, their third league title.

Only one team was relegated this season due to the league's extension to 12 teams ahead of the 1972 season.

Teams and locations
''Note: Table lists in alphabetical order.

League table

Results

Season statistics

Top scorer
 Jan Fuglset, Fredrikstad – 17 goals

Attendances

References
Norway - List of final tables (RSSSF)
Norsk internasjonal fotballstatistikk (NIFS)

Eliteserien seasons
Norway
Norway
1